167th Street may refer to the following stations of the New York City Subway in the Bronx:

167th Street (IRT Jerome Avenue Line); serving the  train
167th Street (IND Concourse Line); serving the  trains